Marry Me is the seventh studio album by English singer-songwriter Olly Murs, released on 2 December 2022 by EMI Records. Following the release of his sixth album, You Know I Know, Murs had no interest in making any new music, until he met his now fiancée Amelia Tank. Murs returned to writing during late 2020 until early 2022. 

The album was preceded by the release of two singles. The lead single "Die of a Broken Heart" was released on 7 October. Followed by the second single "I Hate You When You're Drunk" on 25 November.

Marry Me received generally positive reviews from critics and was a commercial success. In Murs's native United Kingdom it debuted at number one on the UK Albums Chart, becoming Murs's fifth number-one album on the chart.

Background and promotion 
Murs announced in early 2022 that he would be releasing his seventh studio album titled Marry Me. In early September, Murs said that a single would be out soon and later put a teaser on his TikTok of the single "Die of a Broken Heart", a 15-second snippet of the pre-chorus and chorus. Within the first day over 100 videos had used the sound. In November, Murs released a video of him watching the World Cup on his TikTok and labelled it "Where's Wally??? Celebrating that he's got a new single coming out this Friday." This also included a 15-second snippet on his single "I Hate You When You're Drunk".

Tour 
In April 2023, Murs will begin an arena tour throughout the UK. He also announced he would hold a 2023 summer tour.

Tour dates

Track listing

Charts

References 

2022 albums
EMI Records albums
Olly Murs albums